On a steam locomotive, the reversing gear is used to control the direction of travel of the locomotive. It also adjusts the cutoff of the steam locomotive.

Reversing lever

This is the most common form of reverser. It consists of a long lever mounted, parallel to the direction of travel, on the driver’s side of the cab. It has a handle and sprung trigger at the top and is pivoted at the bottom so as to pass between two notched sector plates. The reversing rod, which connects to the valve gear, is attached to this lever, either above or below the pivot, in such a position as to give good leverage. A square pin is arranged so as to engage with the notches in the plates and hold the lever in the desired position when the trigger is released.

The advantages of this design are that change between forward and reverse gear can be made very quickly as is needed in, for example, a shunting engine. Disadvantages are that, because the lever must rest at one of the notches, fine adjustment of the cutoff to offer best running and economy is not possible. On large locomotives it can be difficult to prevent the mechanism from jumping into full forward gear (“nose-diving”) when adjusting the cutoff once the locomotive has gathered speed: with such engines it was the practice of drivers to select an appropriate degree of cutoff before opening the regulator and to leave it in that position for the duration of the journey.

Screw reverser

In this mechanism the reversing rod is controlled by a screw and nut, worked by a wheel in the cab. The nut either operates on the reversing rod directly or through a lever, as above. The screw and nut may be cut with a double thread and a coarse pitch to move the mechanism as quickly as possible. The wheel is fitted with a locking lever to prevent creep and there is an indicator to show the percentage of cutoff in use. This method of altering the cutoff offers finer control than the sector lever, but it has the disadvantage of slow operation. It is most suitable for long-distance passenger engines where frequent changes of cutoff are not required and where fine adjustments offer the most benefit.  On locomotives fitted with Westinghouse air brake equipment and Stephenson valve gear, it was common to use the screw housing as an air cylinder, with the nut extended to form a piston. Compressed air from the brake reservoirs was applied to one side of the piston to reduce the effort required to lift the heavy expansion link, with gravity assisting in the opposite direction.

Power reverse gear

With larger engines, the linkages involved in controlling cutoff and direction grew progressively heavier and there was a need for power assistance in adjusting them.  Steam (or later, compressed air) powered reversing gear was developed in the late 19th and early 20th centuries. Typically, the operator worked a valve that admitted steam to one side or the other of a cylinder connected to the reversing mechanism until the indicator showed the intended position.  A second mechanism, usually a piston in an oil-filled cylinder held in position by closing a control cock, was required to keep the linkages in place. The first locomotive engineer to fit such a device was James Stirling of the Glasgow and South Western Railway in 1873. Several engineers then tried them, including William Dean of the GWR and Vincent Raven of the North Eastern Railway, but they found them little to their liking, mainly because of maintenance difficulties: any oil leakage from the locking cylinder, either through the piston gland or the cock, allowed the mechanism to creep, or worse “nose-dive”, into full forward gear while running. Stirling moved to the South Eastern Railway and Harry Smith Wainwright, his successor with that company,  incorporated them into most of his designs, which were in production about thirty years after Stirling’s innovation. Later still the forward-looking Southern Railway engineer Oliver Bulleid fitted them to his famous Merchant Navy Class of locomotives, but they were mostly removed at rebuild.

Henszey's reversing gear, patented in 1882, illustrates a typical early solution.  Henszey's device consists of two pistons mounted on a single piston rod. Both pistons are double-ended. One is a steam piston to move the rod as required.  The other, containing oil, holds the rod in a fixed position when the steam is turned off.  Control is by a small three-way steam valve (“forward”, “stop”, “back”) and a separate indicator showing the position of the rod and thus the percentage of cutoff in use. When the steam valve is at “stop”, an oil cock connecting the two ends of the locking piston is also closed, thus holding the mechanism in position. The piston rod connects by levers to the reversing gear, which operates in the usual way, according to the type of valve gear in use.

The Ragonnet power reverse, patented in 1909, was a true feedback controlled servomechanism.  The power reverse amplified small motions of reversing lever in the locomotive cab made with modest force into much larger and more forceful motions of the reach rod that controlled the engine cutoff and direction.  It was usually air powered, but could also be steam powered.  The term servomotor was explicitly used by the developers of some later power reverse mechanisms.  The use of feedback control in these later power reverse mechanisms eliminated the need for a second cylinder for a hydraulic locking mechanism, and it restored the simplicity of a single operating lever that both controlled the reversing linkage and indicated its position.

The development of articulated locomotives was a major impetus to the development of power reverse systems, because these typically had two or even three sets of reverse gear, instead of just one on a simple locomotive.  The Baldwin Locomotive Works used the Ragonnet reversing gear, and other American builders generally abandoned positive locking features.  In British use, locking cylinders remained in use.  The Hadfield reversing gear, patented in 1950, was in most particulars a Ragonnet reversing gear with added locking cylinder.
Most Beyer Garratt locomotives used the Hadfield system.

Many American locomotives were built, or retro-fitted, with  power reverse, e.g. PRR K4s, PRR N1s, PRR B6, PRR L1s.

Enginemen's terminology

In the UK, a screw reverser is sometimes called a bacon slicer, particularly the type fitted to BR Standard locomotives. In the US, a reversing lever is called a Johnson bar.

See also 
 Johnson bar (vehicle)

References

Sources
Allen, Cecil J (1949). Locomotive Practice and Performance in the Twentieth Century.. W.Heffer and Sons Ltd, Cambridge.
Bell, A. Morton (1950). Locomotives volume one. Seventh edition. London, Virtue and Company Ltd.

Piston engines